Daniel P. Woodward is an American pilot and military officer who served as director of regional affairs in the Office of the Deputy Under Secretary of the Air Force for International Affairs.

Career 
Woodward received his commission in 1980 as a distinguished graduate of the ROTC program at Embry-Riddle Aeronautical University in Daytona Beach, Florida. He has served in a variety of operational and support positions throughout his career. The general has commanded a support group and a flying training wing. Prior to his last assignment, he was the deputy director of force management on the Joint Staff.

As director, he managed the Air Force's direct liaison with foreign government officials, Washington agency counterparts, and representatives of the aerospace industry to implement Air Force security cooperation programs, particularly the sale of Air Force military equipment to foreign governments. The Regional Affairs Directorate provides analysis and advice to senior leaders on current politico-military affairs and their impact on the Air Force. In this position he also serves as Air Force member, Delegation to Inter-American Defense Board; and Air Force member, Joint Mexico-U.S. Defense Commission.

He is rated as a command pilot with more than 3,000 flight hours. Aircraft flown include: T-37, T-38, FB-111A.

Education
1980 Bachelor of Aeronautical Science degree, Embry-Riddle Aeronautical University, Daytona Beach, Florida
1985 Squadron Officer School, Maxwell Air Force Base, Alabama
1989 Master of Business Administration degree, Mississippi State University, Starkville
1993 Air Command and Staff College
1995 Air War College, Maxwell AFB, Alabama

Assignments
October 1980 – October 1981, student, undergraduate pilot training, Columbus AFB, Miss.
October 1981 – March 1986, T-38 instructor pilot and flight examiner, 14th Flying Training Wing, Columbus AFB, Miss.
March 1986 – October 1990, FB-111A instructor pilot and assistant operations officer, 380th Bomb Wing, Plattsburgh AFB, N.Y.
October 1990 – June 1994, T-37 flight commander, wing executive officer, and Chief, Wing Safety, 47th Flying Training Wing, Laughlin AFB, Texas
June 1994 – June 1995, student, Air War College, Maxwell AFB, Ala.
June 1995 – March 1998, Chief, Combat Training Range Branch; executive officer, Directorate of Operations and Training, Deputy Chief of Staff for, Air and Space Operations, Headquarters U.S. Air Force, Washington, D.C.
March 1998 – February 2000, Deputy Commander, 92d Support Group, Fairchild AFB, Wash.
March 2000 – December 2001, Commander, 78th Support Group, Robins AFB, Ga.
January 2002 – August 2002, executive officer to the Commander, Headquarters Air Education and Training Command, Randolph AFB, Texas
August 2002 – August 2004, Commander, 47th Flying Training Wing, Laughlin AFB, Texas
August 2004 – January 2006, Chief, Forces Division (J-8), Joint Staff, the Pentagon, Washington, D.C.
January 2006 – February 2007, deputy director, Force Management, Directorate for Force Structure, Resources and Assessment (J-8), Joint Staff, the Pentagon, Washington, D.C.
March 2007 – 2009, Director of Regional Affairs, Office of the Deputy Under Secretary of the Air Force for International Affairs, Headquarters U.S. Air Force, Washington, D.C.

Major awards and decorations
  Legion of Merit
  Meritorious Service Medal with three oak leaf clusters
  Joint Service Commendation Medal
  Air Force Commendation Medal with oak leaf cluster
  Air Force Achievement Medal with oak leaf cluster
  Air Force Outstanding Unit Award with four oak leaf clusters
  Air Force Organizational Excellence Award with oak leaf cluster
  Combat Readiness Medal
  National Defense Service Medal with bronze star
  Global War on Terrorism Expeditionary Medal
  Global War on Terrorism Service Medal

Effective dates of promotion
Second lieutenant April 19, 1980
First lieutenant October 19, 1982
Captain October 19, 1984
Major October 1, 1991
Lieutenant colonel March 1, 1994
Colonel March 1, 2000
Brigadier general July 3, 2006

References
USAF Bio

United States Air Force generals
Recipients of the Legion of Merit
Living people
Year of birth missing (living people)